Tom Savarese is a DJ best known for his role in the 1970s Disco music scene. He was born on April 26, 1944 in New York City, and grew up in the Bronx neighborhood. He eventually attended Fordham University. Savarese began his career as a DJ in 1969, playing apartment and house parties. Over time he became the full-time first professional Disco DJ in the US, and doing remixes for record labels in NYC. By the late-1970s Savarese was interviewed as an expert in the Disco music scene by major publications, including the New York Times and Billboard Magazine, calling Savarese the "key New York Disco DJ" in 1977. Billboard Magazine named Savarese the New York DJ of the Year that year, as well as national DJ of the year in 1976 and 1977. Savarese' remixes also charted in the top 20 tracks of the New York Daily News Disco charts. The clubs Savarese played during this era included 12 west, and famously turned down the opportunity to become the first DJ to play and hold residence at the club Studio 54. He was also one of the first DJs to play live during New York City fashion runway shows.

References

External links
 Tom Savarese Discography
 DJs Portal Biography

American disco musicians
Living people
1944 births
People from the Bronx
Fordham University alumni
American DJs